The 20th Senate of Puerto Rico was the upper house of the 12th Legislative Assembly of Puerto Rico that met from January 2, 1993, to January 1, 1997. All members were elected in the General Elections of 1992. The Senate had a majority of members from the New Progressive Party (PNP).

The body is counterparted by the 24th House of Representatives of Puerto Rico in the lower house.

Leadership

Members

Membership

References

External links
Elections result on CEEPUR

22
1993 in Puerto Rico
1994 in Puerto Rico
1995 in Puerto Rico
1996 in Puerto Rico
1997 in Puerto Rico